Hillsborough is a suburb of the City of Lake Macquarie, New South Wales, Australia  from Newcastle's central business district on the eastern side of Lake Macquarie. It is part of the City of Lake Macquarie north ward.

History 
The Aboriginal people, in this area, the Awabakal, were the first people of this land.

In 1874 a coal mining venture was started at Hillsborough, but the coal was found to be of inferior quality and could not be sold. The mine was abandoned in 1879 and the town shortly afterwards. Hillsborough remained a ghost town until it was redeveloped after World War II. Hillsborough Public School opened in 1963.

References

External links 
 History of Hillsborough (Lake Macquarie City Library)

Suburbs of Lake Macquarie